All the World Is Sleeping is a 2021 film written and directed by Ryan Lacen in his solo feature film debut, and starring Melissa Barrera, Jackie Cruz and Jorge Garcia. The film was distributed by Gravitas Ventures.

Synopsis
In New Mexico a young woman resolved not to make the same mistakes as her parents but addiction issues threatens her life with her own daughter.

Cast
Melissa Barrera as Chama 
Valentina Herrera as young Chama
Jackie Cruz as Toaster
Jorge Garcia as Nick
Kristen Gutoskie as Nell
Lisandra Tena as Beatriz 
Luis Bordonada as Santi

Production
Written and directed by Ryan Lacen, the project was produced by Anthony Baldino, Charlene Bencomo, Denicia Cadena, Micaela Lara Cadena, Esperanza Dodge, Tannia Esparza, Carly Hicks, Patricia Marez, Sonja Mereu, Myra Salazar, Jade Sanchez, Kat Sanchez, Ian Simon, Kayleigh Smith, Malissa Trujillo, and Doralee Urban. Lacen told Deadline Hollywood that “a unique collaboration with the non-profit Bold Futures” meant that the project “is not only based on the lived experiences of seven women with a history of addiction, it was made by them”. He added “As a director, whose own family has been affected by addiction, my intention was to create a film that felt truthful”. Barrera plays a composite character based on the experiences of Bold Futures (formerly known as Young Women United), which is a New Mexico-based reproductive justice nonprofit organisation.

Release
The film was shown at the New York Latino Film Festival on September 16, 2021. The film became available to steam on-demand, and had a limited cinema release in the United States, on March 17, 2023.

Reception
Micheal Talbot-Haynes in Film Threat described the film as a “genuine ethnographic study in the oral tradition as much as a dramatic feature” and that it is “one of the most honest and harrowing studies of addiction since ‘Requiem for a Dream.’”

References

External links

2021 films
Films shot in New Mexico
Films set in New Mexico
2021 drama films
2021 directorial debut films
Films about mother–daughter relationships 
Films about addiction
Films about substance abuse